The 2020 Campeonato Paraense Finals was the final that decided the 2020 Campeonato Paraense, the 108th season of the Campeonato Paraense. The final were contested between Paysandu and Remo. 

Paysandu defeated Remo 3–1 on aggregate to win their 48th Campeonato Paraense title.

Road to the final
Note: In all scores below, the score of the home team is given first.

Format
The finals were played on a home-and-away two-legged basis. If tied on aggregate, the penalty shoot-out was used to determine the winner.

Matches

First leg

Second leg

{| width="100%"
|valign="top" width="40%"|

See also
2021 Copa Verde
2021 Copa do Brasil

References

Campeonato Paraense Finals